The 1896 Oregon Agricultural Aggies football team represented Oregon Agricultural College (now known as Oregon State University) as an independent during the 1896 college football season. In their first and only year under head coach Tommy Code, the Aggies compiled a 1–2 record and outscored their opponents by a combined total of 26 to 14. The Aggies defeated Fort Vancouver (18–0), but lost two games against Oregon (0–2, 8–12). A. J. Simpson was the team captain.

Schedule

References

Oregon Agricultural
Oregon State Beavers football seasons
Oregon Agricultural Aggies football